This is a list of rappers from the Gulf Coast. cites surrounding the areas of Houston,
New Orleans, Mobile, Pensacola, Tampa, and Gulfport.

 3-2
 5th Ward Boyz
 5th Ward Juvenilez
 ABN
 Ameer Vann
 Baby Bash
 Big Hawk
 Big Mello
 Big Moe
 Big Pokey
 Boss Hogg Outlawz
 Botany Boyz
 Bun B
 Bushwick Bill
 C-Note
 Chamillionaire
 Chedda Da Connect
 Chingo Bling
 Choice
 Coughee Brothaz
 Crime Boss
 Deep
 Devin the Dude
 DJ Premier
 DJ Screw
 Don Toliver
 Doughbeezy
 E.S.G.
 Expensive Taste
 Fat Pat
 Fat Tony
 Ganksta N-I-P
 Gemini
 Geto Boys
 Hyro Da Hero
 Juan Gotti
 Kirko Bangz
 Lecrae
 Lil' Flip
 Lil' Keke
 Lil' O
 Lil' Troy
 Lucky Luciano
 Maxo Kream
 Megan Thee Stallion
 Mike Jones
 Mr. Mike
 OG Ron C
 O.G. Style
 Paul Wall
 Pimp C
 Riff Raff
 Sauce Walka
 SaulPaul
 Scarface
 Screwed Up Click
 Slim Thug
 South Park Mexican
 The Color Changin' Click
 Tobe Nwigwe
 Too Much Trouble
 Trae tha Truth
 Travis Scott
 Trinity Garden Cartel
 T-Wayne
 UGK
 Ugly God
 Viper
 Willie D
 Z-Ro
 UGK
 Pimp C
 Bun B
 Kevin Abstract
 Foxx
 Kevin Gates
 Lil Boosie
 Lil Phat
 Master P
 Webbie
 Youngboy Never Broke Again
 Fredo Bang
 B.G. (rapper)
 Baby Boy da Prince
 Big Mike (rapper)
 Birdman (rapper)
 Joe Blakk
 Mike Bleed Da BlockStarr
 C-Murder
 Choppa
 Currensy
 Jay Electronica
 Fiend (rapper)
 Flow (rapper)
 Fly Young Red
 Mannie Fresh
 Full Blooded
 G-Slimm
 Kevin Gates
 Aha Gazelle
 Gudda Gudda
 Toya Johnson
 DJ Jubilee
 Juvenile (rapper)
 Kidd Kidd
 Krazy (rapper)
 Lil Wayne
 Lil' Wil
 Rico Love
 Mac (rapper)
 Magic (rapper)
 Mack Maine
 Mr. Marcelo
 Master P
 Romeo Miller
 Messy Mya
 Mystikal
 Nicky da B
 Sissy Nobby
 Nesby Phips
 Katey Red
 Mr. Serv-On
 Silkk the Shocker
 Skull Duggery (rapper)
 Soulja Slim
 Trademark Da Skydiver
 Turk (rapper)
 Chyna Whyte
 Bryan Christopher Williams
 Mia X
 Young Greatness
 Flo Milli
 OMB Peezy
 Rich Boy
 Plies (rapper)
 Khia

Lists of hip hop musicians
 
 Gulf